Pfaltzgraff is an American kitchenware brand of dinnerware, serveware, drinkware and flatware.

History 
It is commonly reported that the Pfaltzgraff company was founded in 1811 in York County, Pennsylvania, by several members of the Pfaltzgraff family who were potters. The most notable member was Johann George Pfaltzgraff, who arrived in York County from Germany in 1833. Johann knew the trade well and passed his skills on to his seven sons. After Johann died in 1873, the family business was carried on by three of his children: John, George, and Henry. The business became official in 1889 when George and Henry started a partnership that would become The Pfaltzgraff Co. The first factory was built in 1895.

The business continued to grow, and in 1960, Pfaltzgraff opened their first retail store under the name Pottery Hill. During the 1950s and 1960s, the products were mostly sold in specialty stores, but in the 1970s, the business made a strategic decision to sell in higher-end department stores, such as G. Fox & Co. and Macy's. 

The Pfaltzgraff Co. was sold to Lifetime Brands, Inc. in 2005. At its height, the company owned and operated 67 stores throughout the U.S., as well as an online presence at www.pfaltzgraff.com. In 2009, Lifetime Brands opted to close all 67 stores and maintain sales only through their Internet presence.

The company continues to produce a product line currently consisting of dinnerware, glassware, flatware, and other kitchen preparatory and cooking tools.

Cultural impact
Several lines of Pfaltzgraff glazed earthenwares have featured among the 100 most popular ceramic designs. 

A large mural depicting Pfaltzgraff's history was painted in York, Pennsylvania in 1998.

References

External links 

 The York Daily Record: Never to be forgotten: A year-by-year look at York County's past (Internet Archive) — 1800–1815 section, see 1811: Conewago Township – Pfaltzgraff pottery starts small.

1889 establishments in Pennsylvania
American brands
American companies established in 1889
Ceramics manufacturers of the United States
Companies based in York County, Pennsylvania
Design companies established in 1889
Kitchenware brands
Manufacturing companies based in Pennsylvania
Manufacturing companies established in 1889
York, Pennsylvania
Cutlery brands